The following is a list of hospitals in Yemen.  Notable  hospitals are listed, including name, address, city and references.  Links to articles in Wikipedia are included when they exist.

Notable hospitals

References

Yemen

Hospitalsi
Yemen